Techo is a wetland, part of the Wetlands of Bogotá, located in the neighbourhood Techo in the locality Kennedy, Bogotá, Colombia. Techo is located in the basins of the Bogotá River and its main tributaries Fucha and Tunjuelo.

Etymology 
The name Techo is taken from Techovita, the name of a cacique in the Muisca Confederation, the former country on the Altiplano Cundiboyacense before the Spanish conquest.

Flora and fauna

Flora 
Flora registered in Techo are among others Hydrocotyle ranunculoides, Lemna minor, Typha latifolia and Juncus bogotensis.

Birds 
In Techo, 53 bird species have been registered, of which one endemic, uniquely to this wetland, the common nighthawk (Chordeiles minor.

Other bird species as the yellow-hooded blackbird (Chrysomus icterocephalus bogotensis), great crested flycatcher (Myiarchus crinitus) and black flowerpiercer (Diglossa humeralis) have been spotted in Techo.

See also 

Biodiversity of Colombia, Bogotá savanna, Thomas van der Hammen Natural Reserve
Wetlands of Bogotá

References

Bibliography

External links 
  Fundación Humedales de Bogotá
  Conozca los 15 humedales de Bogotá - El Tiempo

Wetlands of Bogotá
Muysccubun